Pacing is an activity management technique for managing a long-term health condition or disability, aiming to maximize what a person can do while reducing, or at least controlling, any symptoms that restrict activity. Pacing is commonly used to help manage conditions that cause chronic pain or chronic fatigue.

Aims 
Pacing aims to manage symptoms by avoiding the "boom and bust" cycle that is common among people exceeding their current, limited capacities. This often leads to being forced to stop their activities as a result of pain, fatigue or other symptoms, and then requiring a large amount of rest before being able to resume their activity. The cycle then repeats.

Elements of pacing 
There is no consensus regarding what elements are part of pacing. Pacing typically involves:
 planning activities in advance
 taking regular rest breaks
 choosing activities based on available energy
 prioritizing activities

Uses
Pacing has been used to help manage a wide variety of different illnesses and disabilities, including neuromuscular diseases like Charcot-Marie-Tooth disease (CMT), rheumatoid or immune-mediated diseases like rheumatoid arthritis, juvenile arthritis and fibromyalgia, chronic fatigue syndrome, and Ehlers–Danlos syndromes (EDS).

Outcomes 
In many health conditions, there are no clinical trials to establish the effectiveness of pacing.

See also 
 Spoon theory

References 

Disability accommodations
Physical therapy
Chronic fatigue syndrome
Pain management